This is a List of clubs in the 2. Bundesliga, including all clubs and their final placings from 1974–75 to 2021–22. The league is the second-highest football league in Germany and the German football league system. It replaced the Regionalligas as the second division in Germany in 1974. Initially played in a two-division format, north and south, it was merged into a single division in 1981 and has remained at this format ever since with the exception of the 1991–92 season, when the league was briefly split again to accommodate the influx of clubs from the former East Germany.

Overview
After the introduction of the Bundesliga in 1963 the second division was initially formed by five Regionalligas with a promotion round at the end. In 1974 this system was changed to two regional divisions which were named 2. Bundesliga Süd and Nord. This halved the number of second division teams from a nominal number of 40 to 20. In the 1991–92 season the league was briefly split into a northern and southern division of 12 clubs each to allow for the entry of the East German clubs into the league system. Since 1992 the league has always operated as a single division, initially with 20 clubs, later with 18.

List of clubs
The list of clubs of the 2. Bundesliga from its inception to the present season, sorted by the last season a club played in the league:

Key

Placings

1974–1981
The placings in the two divisions of the 2. Bundesliga from its interception to the change to a single-division format:

Nord

Süd

1981–1991
The placings in the 2. Bundesliga from its first season as a single-division league to the last season before the German reunion:

1991–present
The placings in the 2. Bundesliga from the German reunion to the present season:

Key

Notes
 FC St. Pauli (1978–79), TSV 1860 Munich (1981–82), Rot-Weiß Oberhausen (1987–88), Kickers Offenbach (1988–89), Rot-Weiss Essen (1990–91 and 1993–94), Blau-Weiß 90 Berlin (1991–92), 1. FC Saarbrücken (1994–95), Tennis Borussia Berlin (1999–2000) and MSV Duisburg (2012–13) were demoted from the league after having their licenses revoked.
 1. FSV Mainz 05 (1975–76), Westfalia Herne (1978–79) and DSC Wanne-Eickel (1979–80) voluntarily withdrew from the league.
 ‡ Denotes clubs from the region of former East Germany which joined the German football league system in 1991. Note that clubs may have been formed after the German reunion which, for example, is the case with RB Leipzig.
 1 Bayer Uerdingen was renamed KFC Uerdingen 05 in 1995.
 2 DJK Gütersloh merged with Arminia Gütersloh in 1978 to form FC Gütersloh.
 3 SpVgg Fürth merged with TSV Vestenbergsgreuth in 1996 to form SpVgg Greuther Fürth.
 4 ESV Ingolstadt merged with MTV Ingolstadt in 2004 to form FC Ingolstadt 04.
 5 BV Lüttringhausen was renamed BVL Remscheid in 1985 and merged with VfB Marathon Remscheid in 1990 to form FC Remscheid.
 6 TuS Schloß Neuhaus merged with FC Paderborn in 1985 to form TuS Paderborn-Neuhaus and was renamed SC Paderborn 07 in 1997.
 7 LR Ahlen was renamed Rot-Weiß Ahlen in 2006.

References

External links
  
 DFB — Deutscher Fußball Bund – 2. Bundesliga (German Football Association)

Clubs
Bundesliga, 2
 List